Severin Cecile Abega (22 November 1955 – 24 March 2008) was a Cameroonian author, anthropologist and researcher.

Biography 
Severin Cecile Abega was born in 1955 at Saa in the South of Cameroon. He died on 24 March 2008 in Yaoundé, the Capital (political and administrative) city of Cameroon.

He studied anthropology, and was a well-established Cameroonian writer producing classics like "Les Bimanes". Severin Cecile Abega tried to stay objective and to discuss the changes in the Cameroonian society good or bad. With his great sense of humor and his mastery of the language, he was  able to relate the realities of corruption in a country marred by it.

At the time of his death, he was teaching at the Catholic Institute of Africa, in Yaoundé, Cameroon.

Bibliography 
 Les Bimanes (1982)
This is book of seven short stories. They all relate to the humanity, and the social conditions prevalent in the Cameroonian society. Full of humor, Severin Cecile Abega tries to show the society as it is in both a formal and informal way. His mastery of the language, and his great sense of humor have made this book a classic of Cameroonian literature... especially taught in high school.

Extract from the book:
-Vous pensez que vous n’a pas besoin aussi de quelqu’un? Sé vous à hôpital, vous ne soignez que ton frère, votre ami, vous ne pas soigner les autres. Quand zé souis véni, vous avez dit que zé dois mourir parce que moi zé ne souis pas ton frère, parce que zé n’a pas mouillé la barbe de vous. Vous ici, z’être aussi dans mon bureau. Moi zé refisé aussi de vous vendre les soyas, parce que vous n’a pas mouillé ma barbe. Vous refisez me soigner, moi refisé vous vendre. Allez dirre! - Vous commandez là-bas, moi aussi zé commandé ici. Allez m’ackiser.
‘-Vous croyez que vous n’avez pas besoin de quelqu’un d'autre? C’est vous que j’ai rencontré à l'hôpital. Vous refusez de soigner les gens, en dehors de vos parents et amis. Lorsque j’étais à l'hôpital dernièrement, vous avez refusé de me soigner parce que je ne suis pas votre parent, parce que je ne vous ai pas corrompu. Ici, vous êtes aussi à mon bureau. Parce que vous ne m’avez pas corrompu, je ne vous vend pas le soya. Vous avez refusé de me soigner; je refuse aussi de vous vendre le soya. Allez au ciel! Vous êtes patron à l'hôpital, moi aussi je suis patron ici. Allez vous faire foutre!’

The speaker, whose name is Garba, is a professional salesman of roasted meat commonly known in Cameroon as ‘soya’. In the text, he refuses to sell soya to a nurse who couple of days ago refused to give him medical attention at the hospital when he was suffering from an injury. (this outlines the corruption by which a nurse refuses to serve a patient, because that patient does not have enough money to pay, or is not his relative).

 Le Bourreau (2004)
A man tells the story of his friend who will be executed by a professional who receives his orders from people at the higher echelons of society. Kyrielle, a young lady, tries to see him to plead the life of her boyfriend, but falls in love with the "bourreau". This book, full of humor, succeeds in relating the desensitization of society in the faces of horror.

 Entre Terre et Ciel
 Contes du Sud du Cameroun: Beme et le fetiche de son pere (2002)
 Societe civile et reduction de la pauvrete
 Les choses de la foret. Les masques des princes Tikar de Nditam
 Le sein t'es pris
 Pygmees Baka
 La latrine (1987)
 Les violences sexuelles et l'État au Cameroun (2007)
 Jankina et autres contes Pygmees (2003)

References 

1955 births
2008 deaths
20th-century anthropologists
People from Centre Region (Cameroon)
Cameroonian short story writers
Cameroonian novelists
Cameroonian male writers
Male novelists
21st-century novelists
21st-century anthropologists
20th-century novelists
20th-century short story writers
21st-century short story writers
20th-century male writers
21st-century male writers